William Frederick Waldow (August 26, 1882 – April 16, 1930) was a United States representative from New York. Born in Buffalo, he attended the common schools, apprenticed as a plumber, and later engaged as a plumbing contractor. He was elected a member of the board of aldermen of Buffalo in 1912 and 1913 and was a member of the New York Republican State committee in 1916.

Waldow was elected as a Republican to the Sixty-fifth Congress, holding office from March 4, 1917, to March 3, 1919. He was unsuccessful for reelection in 1918 to the Sixty-sixth Congress and resumed former business pursuits. He was a delegate to the Republican National Convention in 1920 and was sheriff of Erie County from 1921 to 1923. He died in Snyder (a suburb of Buffalo) in 1930; interment was in Forest Lawn Cemetery.

References
 

1882 births
1930 deaths
American plumbers
Politicians from Buffalo, New York
Republican Party members of the United States House of Representatives from New York (state)
20th-century American politicians